Mandailing or Mandailing Batak is an Austronesian language spoken in Indonesia, the northern island of Sumatra. It is spoken mainly in Mandailing Natal Regency, North Padang Lawas Regency, Padang Lawas Regency, and eastern parts of Labuhan Batu Regency, North Labuhan Batu Regency, South Labuhan Batu Regency and northwestern parts of Riau Province. It is written using the Latin script but historically used Batak script.

Literature

Classical 
Mandailing literary art is transmitted through a distinctive tradition, for example through the following media:

 : Tradition tells the story in a verbal social context. Stories are transmitted from generation to generation. The plot uses advanced themes and a lot of content about manners.
 : Differentiated by the theme.  is an expression of the heart, a change due to various things, such as the misery of life due to death, abandonment, and others. It also contains knowledge, advice, moral teachings, kinship system, and so on.  laments use the pattern of rhymes with ab-ab or aa-aa. Attachments usually use a lot of plant names, because the language leaves.

Example :

Colonial period 

Some of the literary milestones that developed in the colonial period include:

 Willem Iskander (1840–1876) wrote the books
 Hendrik Nadenggan Roa, Sada Boekoe Basaon ni Dakdanak (Translations). Padang: Van Zadelhoff and Fabritius (1865).
 Leesboek van W.C. Thurn in het Mandhelingsch Vertaald. Batavia: Landsdrukkerij (1871).
 Si Bulus-bulus Si Rumbuk-rumbuk (1872).
 Taringot ragam ni Parbinotoan dohot Sinaloan ni Alak Eropa. This text is adapted from the book The Story of the Science of the White Persons written by Abdullah Munsyi, a Malay linguist and linguist (1873).
 Soetan Martua Raja (Siregar). He was born into an aristocratic family in Bagas Lombang Sipirok, an educated HIS, an elite school in Pematang Siantar. His works include:
 Hamajuon (elementary school reading material).
 Doea Sadjoli: Boekoe Siseon ni Dakdanak di Sikola (1917). This book raises the critique of children's thinking and is written in Latin script (Soerat Oelando), which is relatively developed secular pedagogy.
 Ranto Omas (Golden Chain), 1918.
 Soetan Hasoendoetan (Sipahutar), novelist and journalist. His works:
 Turi-Turian (stories, tells the relationship of interaction between man and the ruler of the sky).
 Sitti Djaoerah: Padan Djandji na Togoe (1927–1929), an Angkola Mandailing-language series in 457 pages. The series is published in the weekly Pustaha published in Sibolga. This story is believed to be the reason readers buy the newspaper. The series adopts epic tales, and various social terminology of Angkola-Mandailing society and is written in novel style. This is in line with the development of Malay-language novels published by the colonial government. In the history of Indonesian literature, this period is known as the Angkatan Balai Pustaka or Angkatan 1920s. Hasundutan said that he wrote the novel because after being inspired by the novel Siti Nurbaja (Marah Rusli, 1922) which was very popular at that time.
 Datoek Toengkoe Adji Malim Leman (1941), published by Sjarief, Pematang Siantar.
 Mangaradja Goenoeng Sorik Marapi wrote the book Turian-turian ni Raja Gorga di Langit dohot Raja Suasa di Portibi. It is published by Pustaka Murni, Pematang Siantar titled 1914.
 Sutan Pangurabaan. His works include Ampang Limo Bapole (1930), Parkalaan Tondoeng (1937), Parpadanan (1930), and a Malay book, Mentjapai Doenia Baroe (1934). In addition to books written by Willem Iskander, his books were also used in colonial school.
 Soetan Habiaran Siregar explores the languages, dances, and songs from Angkola-Mandailing. He writes several royalties, among others: Turi-turian ni Tunggal Panaluan, Panangkok Saring-Saring tu Tambak na Timbo (1983), and others. In addition, he also composed songs using a rhythmic cha-cha beat.

In addition to Mandailing Angkola's literary language, it is important to note the growth of Malay-language Indonesian literature adopting local color: for example, the novel Azab dan Sengsara (1921) written by Merari Siregar. This novel includes contextual customs and cultures such as forced marriage, inheritance, kinship relations, and the local traditions of Mandailing-Angkola.

Contemporary 
Contemporary Mandailing literature is no longer developed since pre-independence, as the changing national education curriculum using the national language by itself erodes the use of Mandailing languages.

Entertainment 
Lyrics and musical dramas in the Mandailing language include:
 The musical drama of the 1970s in a tape cassette recorder.
 The drama .
 Mandailing song album in an early VCD fragment.
 Album by Tapsel, Madina, Palas and Paluta.

Variety 
Pangaduan Lubis proposes that Mandailing has five registers, each having a distinct vocabulary:

  is the variety of language that is used in everyday life.
  is the kind of language used in quarrels or to berate someone.
  is the kind of language that Mandailing people used in the past when they searched for camphor.

Examples of vocabulary:

In the past, the Mandailing people also had a particular communication tool or kind of language called  ('foliage language'). This language is not a symbol of sound but uses the leaves of plants as a symbol.

Numbers

Questions

Sources 
  Adelaar, Alexander, The Austronesian Languages of Asia and Madagascar: A Historical Perspective, The Austronesian Languages of Asia and Madagascar, pp. 1–42, Routledge Language Family Series, Londres: Routledge, 2005, 
  Siregar, Ahmad Samin, Kamus Bahasa Angkola/Mandailing Indonesia, Jakarta: Pusat Pembinaan Dan Pengembangan Bahasa, Departemen Pendidikan Dan Kebudayaan, 1977.

References

External links
 
 Kamus Mandailing
 

Batak languages
Languages of Indonesia